The Chennai Port – Maduravoyal Expressway is a  long, six lane, double-decker elevated expressway under construction in the city of Chennai, Tamil Nadu, India. The corridor begins at Chennai Port Gate No. 10 and travels along the bank of the Cooum River till it reaches Koyambedu and along the median of NH4 thereon till it reaches Maduravoyal.

History
Upon completion, this will be the country's longest six-way elevated expressway. The project was sanctioned in June 2007 when the Tamil Nadu Government gave its 'in principle' approval to the National Highways Authority of India (NHAI) for the elevated expressway. The project cost then was put at 1,468 crore. In January 2009, the Prime Minister, Dr. Manmohan Singh, laid the foundation stone for the project but the project was put on hold for want of environment clearance. The project has got the environment clearance in February 2011, and during the same month, the port handed over a cheque for 50 crore to the NHAI as part of its contribution to the project. 

The expressway starts from Gate No. 10 of the Chennai Port near the War Memorial and ends before Maduravoyal Interchange. It would run along the banks of the Cooum up to Koyambedu and would end along the Cooum near the Koyambedu grade separator. From there for a distance of three km up to Maduravoyal the elevated expressway would come up on Poonamallee High Road. There would be a total of four entry and exit ramps as part of the project. While the entry ramps would come up on Sivananda Salai and College Road, the exit points would be provided on Spurtank Road and Kamaraj Salai. The work at the Maduravoyal end began in December 2010. The project is being implemented on a build, own and transfer mode. Of the total project cost of 1,655 crore, 310 crore has been set aside for land acquisition and rehabilitation and resettlement of nearly 7,400 people living along the project area. About 1,300 people have been rehabilitated at Okkiam Thoraipakkam. Of 30 hectares to be acquired for the project, only 2 hectares belong to private owners. The project was initially expected to be completed by end of 2013. However, the project has been put on hold.

Project Details
This corridor is implemented under Phase-VII of National Highways Development Project by NHAI. The Feasibility study cum DPR was done by Wilbur Smith Associates. This expressway forms a part of the circular corridor 2 of the High Speed Circular Corridors.

Alignment
 Km 0 - Km 1.56 reaches Northern Cooum River bank and parallel to MRTS line
 @ Km 2.1, the Expressway crosses the Elevated MRTS line between Chintadripet and Park Town Stations
 @ Km 3.2,
 @ Km 13.8, the Road splits into two and merges with NH4 as entry and exit ramps.
 The Expressway section meets the Koyambedu Grade Separator and the section between them will be 10-laned with 2-lane service roads on both sides
 At-grade stretch of 1.5 km because of Koyambedu Grade Separator and Chennai Metro over-head line crossing just after the grade separator
 @ Km 14.227, the Elevated Expressway restarts and goes along NH4 median
 @ Km 17.3, the Expressway starts coming down and meet the Maduravoyal clover-leaf grade separator and the section will be 14-laned [8-lane toll plaza + 6-lane NH4] with 2-lane service roads on both sides
 Elevated section — 17.5 km
 Total Length - 19 km

Interchanges

 A modified parclo interchange is under construction at Koyambedu junction with 2 arms of a clover leaf and an elevated loop on the third side.

Entry ramps
 Sivananda Salai
 College Road

Exit ramps
 Kamarajar Salai
 Spur Tank Road

Project timeline

Gallery

References

Expressways in Tamil Nadu
Chennai HSCTC
Proposed roads in India
Transport in Chennai